East Huinan is a station on Line 16 of the Shanghai Metro in Pudong, Shanghai.

The station has 4 platforms, but only the 2 outer platforms are in regular service. Express trains usually pass through the middle 2 tracks.
The station is in Haishen Village. The roof above the elevated platforms is designed in a traditional Chinese style.

References

Railway stations in Shanghai
Line 16, Shanghai Metro
Shanghai Metro stations in Pudong
Railway stations in China opened in 2013